Faleria is a  (municipality) in the Province of Viterbo in the Italian region of Latium, located about  north of Rome and about  southeast of Viterbo.

Faleria borders the following municipalities: Calcata, Castel Sant'Elia, Civita Castellana, Mazzano Romano, Rignano Flaminio, Sant'Oreste.

References

External links
 Official website

Cities and towns in Lazio